Xylophanes tersa, the tersa sphinx, is a moth of the family Sphingidae. The species was first described by Carl Linnaeus in 1771. It is found from the United States (Massachusetts south to southern Florida, west to Nebraska, New Mexico and southern Arizona), through Mexico, the West Indies and Central America and into parts of South America (including Bolivia, Paraguay, Argentina and Brazil). An occasional stray can be found as far north as Canada.

The wingspan is 60–80 mm. The upperside of the forewing is pale brown with lavender gray at the base and has dark brown lines. The upperside of the hindwing is dark brown with a band of whitish, wedge-shaped marks. Adults are on wing from May to October in the north and February to November farther south in the US, and they fly year round in the tropics. There is one generation in the north and several generations farther south, in Florida and Louisiana, for example. The adults feed on the nectar of various flowers, including Lonicera, Mirabilis jalapa and Asystasia gangetica.

The larvae feed on Borreria, Catalpa, Manettia, and Pentas species, and Spermacoce glabra, Hamelia patens, Hedyotis nigricans, Heimia salicifolia, Psychotria microdon, Psychotria nervosa, and Inga vera.

Subspecies
Xylophanes tersa chaconi De Marmels, Clavijo & Chacín, 1996 (Venezuela)
Xylophanes tersa tersa

References

External links
Xylophanes tersa tersa. Sphingidae of the Americas.

tersa
Moths of North America
Moths of South America
Moths described in 1771
Taxa named by Carl Linnaeus